The Post-90 generation (or ) is a generation in China, especially in urban areas, generally considered to be born between 1990 and 1999 though sometimes considered to start with those born in the fall of 1989 (as they would graduate in the same class as those born in 1990). They are the second generation of Chinese people to have fully grown up in the post-Tiananmen era and the first generation to be born after the protests. They are also China's last 20th-century-born cohort.

They are alleged to have traits that are similar to the Post-80s generation, such as the Little Emperor Syndrome and a knack for information technology and capitalism, but in a much more highly developed way. On the other hand, the post-1990 generation is also characterized as being more realistic about their place in society than the post-1980 generation.

The Post-90 generation is also alleged to have less of a sense of hierarchy in the workplace and more of a sense of individuality compared to older generations.

The Post-90 generation have distinct cultural characteristics and are often stereotyped as "lazy, promiscuous, confused, selfish, brain-damaged and overall hopeless".

Unlike the Post-80 generation, which witnessed a glimpse of pre-affluent China in the late 1980s and 1990s, all but the oldest members of the Post-90 generation have only known a booming urban China for most of their lives.

See also

Generation Y
Generation Z
Internet in China
Moonlight clan
One child policy
Strawberry generation, the equivalent generation in Taiwan (born 1981–1991)
9X Generation, equivalent demographic cohort from Vietnam.

References

1990s in China
Society of China
Demographics of China
Special idioms of modern Chinese language
Cultural generations

zh:八零後#衍生的词语